The Barents Sea (also  ; ,) is a marginal sea of the Arctic Ocean, located off the northern coasts of Norway and Russia and divided between Norwegian and Russian territorial waters. It was known among Russians in the Middle Ages as the Murman Sea ("Norse Sea"); the current name of the sea is after the historical Dutch navigator Willem Barentsz.

It is bordered by the Kola Peninsula to the south, the shelf edge towards the Norwegian Sea to the west, and the archipelagos of Svalbard to the northwest, Franz Josef Land to the northeast and Novaya Zemlya to the east. The islands of Novaya Zemlya, an extension of the northern end of the Ural Mountains, separate the Barents Sea from the Kara Sea.

Although part of the Arctic Ocean, the Barents Sea has been characterised as "turning into the Atlantic" or in process of being "Atlantified" because of its status as "the Arctic warming hot spot." Hydrologic changes due to global warming have led to a reduction in sea ice and in stratification of the water column, which could produce major changes in weather in Eurasia. One prediction is that as the Barents Sea's permanent ice-free area grows additional evaporation will increase winter snowfalls in much of continental Europe.

Geography

The southern half of the Barents Sea, including the ports of Murmansk (Russia) and Vardø (Norway) remain ice-free year round due to the warm North Atlantic drift.  In September, the entire Barents Sea is more or less completely ice-free.  Until 1944, Finland's territory also reached to the Barents Sea. The Liinakhamari harbor in the Pechengsky District was Finland's only ice-free winter harbor until it was ceded to the Soviet Union.

There are three main types of water masses in the Barents Sea: Warm, salty Atlantic water (temperature >3 °C, salinity >35) from the North Atlantic drift; cold Arctic water (temperature <0 °C, salinity <35) from the north; and warm, but not very salty, coastal water (temperature >3 °C, salinity <34.7). Between the Atlantic and Polar waters, a front called the Polar Front is formed.  In the western parts of the sea (close to Bear Island), this front is determined by the bottom topography and is therefore relatively sharp and stable from year to year, while in the east (towards Novaya Zemlya), it can be quite diffuse and its position can vary markedly between years.

The lands of Novaya Zemlya attained most of their early Holocene coastal deglaciation approximately 10,000 years before present.

Extent
The International Hydrographic Organization defines the limits of the "Barentsz Sea"  as follows:

On the west: The northeastern limit of the Norwegian Sea [A line joining the southernmost point of West Spitzbergen  to North Cape of Bear Island, through this island to Cape Bull and thence on to North Cape in Norway (25°45'E)].

On the northwest: The eastern shore of West Spitzbergen , Hinlopen Strait up to 80° latitude north; south and east coasts of North-East Land [island of Nordaustlandet] to Cape Leigh Smith.

On the north: Cape Leigh Smith across the Islands Bolshoy Ostrov (Great Island) [Storøya], Gilles [Kvitøya] and Victoria; Cape Mary Harmsworth (southwestern extremity of Alexandra Land) along the northern coasts of Franz-Josef Land as far as Cape Kohlsaat.

On the east: Cape Kohlsaat to Cape Zhelaniya (Desire); west and southwest coast of Novaya Zemlya to Cape Kussov Noss and thence to western entrance Cape, Dolgaya Bay on Vaigach Island. Through Vaigach Island to Cape Greben; thence to Cape Belyi Noss on the mainland.

On the south: The northern limit of the White Sea [A line joining Svyatoi Nos (Murmansk Coast, 39°47'E) and Cape Kanin].

Other islands in the Barents Sea include Chaichy and Timanets.

Geology

The Barents Sea was originally formed from two major continental collisions: the Caledonian orogeny, in which the Baltica and Laurentia collided to form Laurasia, and a subsequent collision between Laurasia and Western Siberia.  Most of its geological history is dominated by extensional tectonics, caused by the collapse of the Caledonian and Uralian orogenic belts and the break-up of Pangaea. These events created the major rift basins that dominate the Barents Shelf, along with various platforms and structural highs.  The later geological history of the Barents Sea is dominated by Late Cenozoic uplift, particularly that caused by Quaternary glaciation, which has resulted in erosion and deposition of significant sediment.

Ecology

Due to the North Atlantic drift, the Barents Sea has a high biological production compared to other oceans of similar latitude.  The spring bloom of phytoplankton can start quite early near the ice edge, because the fresh water from the melting ice makes up a stable water layer on top of the sea water. The phytoplankton bloom feeds zooplankton such as Calanus finmarchicus, Calanus glacialis, Calanus hyperboreus, Oithona spp., and krill. The zooplankton feeders include young cod, capelin, polar cod, whales, and little auk. The capelin is a key food for top predators such as the north-east Arctic cod, harp seals, and seabirds such as common guillemot and Brunnich's guillemot.  The fisheries of the Barents Sea, in particular the cod fisheries, are of great importance for both Norway and Russia.

SIZEX-89 was an international winter experiment in 1989 for which the main objectives were to perform sensor signature studies of different ice types in order to develop SAR algorithms for ice variables, such as ice types, ice concentrations and ice kinematics.
Although previous research suggested that predation by whales may be the cause of depleting fish stocks, more recent research suggests that marine mammal consumption has only a trivial influence on fisheries. A model assessing the effects of fisheries and climate was far more accurate at describing trends in fish abundance. There is a genetically distinct polar bear population associated with the Barents Sea.

Connections to global weather

History

Name
The Barents Sea was formerly known to Russians as Murmanskoye More, or the "Sea of Murmans" (i.e., their term for Norwegians). It appears with this name in sixteenth-century maps, including Gerard Mercator's Map of the Arctic published in his 1595 atlas. Its eastern corner, in the region of the Pechora River's estuary, has been known as Pechorskoye Morye, that is, Pechora Sea.

This sea was given its present name by Europeans in honor of Willem Barentsz, a Dutch navigator and explorer. Barentsz was the leader of early expeditions to the far north, at the end of the sixteenth century.

The Barents Sea has been called by sailors "The Devil's Dance Floor" due to its unpredictability and difficulty level.

Ocean rowers call it "Devil's Jaw". In 2017, after the first recorded complete man-powered crossing of the Barents Sea from Tromsø to Longyearbyen in a row boat by Polar Row expedition, captain Fiann Paul was asked by Norwegian TV2 how a rower would name the Barents Sea. Fiann responded that he would name it "Devil's Jaw", adding that the winds you constantly battle are like breath from the devil's nostrils while he holds you in his jaws.

Modern era
Seabed mapping was completed in 1933; the first full map was produced by Russian marine geologist Maria Klenova.

The Barents Sea was the site of a notable World War II engagement which later became known as the Battle of the Barents Sea. Under the command of Oskar Kummetz, German warships sank minelayer HMS Bramble and destroyer , but lost destroyer . Also, the German cruiser  was severely damaged by British gunfire. The Germans later retreated and the British convoy arrived safely at Murmansk shortly afterwards.

During the Cold War, the Soviet Red Banner Northern Fleet used the southern reaches of the sea as a ballistic missile submarine bastion, a strategy that Russia continues. Nuclear contamination from dumped Russian naval reactors is an environmental concern in the Barents Sea.

Economy

Political status

For decades there was a boundary dispute between Norway and Russia regarding the position of the boundary between their respective claims to the Barents Sea.  The Norwegians favoured a median line, based on the Geneva Convention of 1958, whereas the Russians favoured a meridian- based sector line, based on a Soviet decision of 1926.  A neutral "grey" zone between the competing claims had an area of 175,000 sq.km, which is approximately 12% of the total area of the Barents Sea.  The two countries started negotiations on the location of the boundary in 1974, and agreed to a moratorium on hydrocarbon exploration in 1976.

Twenty years after the fall of the Soviet Union, in 2010 Norway and Russia signed an agreement that placed the boundary equidistant from their competing claims. This was ratified and went into force on 7 July 2011, opening the grey zone for hydrocarbon exploration.

Oil and gas

Encouraged by the success of oil exploration and production in the North Sea in the 1960s, Norway began hydrocarbon exploration in the Barents Sea in 1969.  They acquired seismic reflection surveys through the following years, which were analysed to understand the location of the main sedimentary basins. NorskHydro drilled the first well in 1980, which was a dry hole, and the first discoveries were made the following year: the Alke and Askeladden gas fields.  Several more discoveries were made on the Norwegian side of the Barents Sea throughout the 1980s, including the important Snøhvit field.

But, interest in the area began to wane due to a succession of dry holes, wells containing only gas (which was cheap at the time), and the prohibitive costs of developing wells in such a remote area.  Interest in the area was reignited in the late 2000s, after the Snovhit field was finally brought into production and two new large discoveries were made.

The Russians began exploration in their territory around the same time, encouraged by their success in the Timan-Pechora Basin.  They drilled their first wells in the early 1980s, and some very large gas fields were discovered throughout this decade.  The Shtokman field was discovered in 1988 and is classed as a giant gas field: currently the 5th-largest gas field in the world.  Similar practical difficulties Barents Sea resulted in a decline in Russian exploration, aggravated by the nation's political instability of the 1990s.

Fishing

The Barents Sea contains the world's largest remaining cod population, as well as important stocks of haddock and capelin.  Fishing is managed jointly by Russia and Norway in the form of the Joint Norwegian–Russian Fisheries Commission, established in 1976, in an attempt to keep track of how many fish are leaving the ecosystem due to fishing.  The Joint Norwegian-Russian Fisheries Commission sets Total Allowable Catches (TACs) for multiple species throughout their migratory tracks.  Through the Commission, Norway and Russia also exchange fishing quotas and catch statistics to ensure the TACs are not being violated.

But there are problems with reporting under this system, and researchers believe that they do not have accurate data for the effects of fishing on the Barents Sea ecosystem. Cod is one of the major catches. A large portion of catches are not reported when the fishing boats land, in order to account for profits that are being lost to high taxes and fees.  Since many fishermen do not strictly follow the TACs and rules set forth by the Commission, the amount of fish being extracted annually from the Barents Sea is underestimated.

Barents Sea biodiversity and marine bioprospecting
The Barents Sea, where temperate waters from the Gulf Stream and cold waters from the Arctic meet, is home to an enormous diversity of organisms, which are well adapted to the extreme conditions of their marine habitats. This makes these arctic species very attractive for marine bioprospecting. Marine bioprospecting may be defined as the search for bioactive molecules and compounds from marine sources having new, unique properties and the potential for commercial applications. Amongst others, applications include medicines, food and feed, textiles, cosmetics and the process industry.

The Norwegian government strategically supports the development of marine bioprospecting as it has the potential to contribute to new and sustainable wealth creation. Tromsø and the northern areas of Norway play a central role in this strategy. They have excellent access to unique Arctic marine organisms, existing marine industries, and R&D competence and infrastructure in this region. Since 2007, science and industry have cooperated closely on bioprospecting, and the development and commercialization of new products.

See also

 Barents Basin
 Continental shelf of Russia
 Energy in Norway
 List of largest biotechnology & pharmaceutical companies
 List of oil and gas fields of the Barents Sea
 List of seas

Notes

References
 Ole Gunnar Austvik (2006) Oil and gas in the High North, Security Policy Library no. 4, The Norwegian Atlantic Committee. ISSN 0802-6602.
 C. Michael Hogan (2008) Polar Bear: Ursus maritimus, Globaltwitcher.com, ed. Nicklas Stromberg.
 World Wildlife Fund (2008). Barents Sea environment and conservation.

External links

 Barents.com—Developing the Barents Region
 Foraminifera of the Barents Sea—illustrated catalog

 
Norway–Russia border
Seas of Norway
Seas of Russia